Hermann Alois Boehm (27 October 1884 – 7 June 1962) was a German eugenicist, doctor, professor of "racial hygiene" and during the Nazi era. Boehm became a member of the NSDAP on 24 March 1925, with member number 126.

Biography 
Boehm began early to expand his research into racial hygiene. He was regarded within the NSDAP as a person with a considerable level of knowledge in this field, so that he was entrusted with the relevant posts. From 1931, he served as racial hygiene adviser of the National Socialist German Doctors' League and from June 1933 to July 1934 as scientific director for heredity and race hygiene at the Reich Committee on Public Health.

On 19 November 1934, he was appointed extraordinary Honorary Professor of Racial Care at the University of Leipzig. The main focus of his scientific publishing activities until 1934 was mainly on racial hygiene issues; he later advanced into the first rank of race hygienists. In March 1937, Boehm was appointed as a training manager by the Reich physician Gerhard Wagner of the "Führerschule" (Leader School) in Alt Rehse. The focus of Boehm's work was the teaching of knowledge in heritage and race care. At the same time, Boehm was given the opportunity to set up his own genetic engineering research institute.

This institute was primarily intended to introduce the course participants of the "Führerschule" to the basics of genetics. In addition to his actual work at the "Führerschule", Boehm was one of the few independent experts to compile hereditary biological assessments.  Boehm was an ordinary professor of racial improvement at Giessen from 1 January 1943, until the end of World War II.

The training at the "Führerschule" laid the spiritual foundation, provided the necessary racial hygiene equipment, which ultimately allowed the doctor to end even the "life unworthy of life" by lethal injection, food deprivation or gas.

References

Footnotes

Bibliography 

 

1884 births
1962 deaths
Academic staff of the University of Rostock
Alldeutscher Verband members
German eugenicists
Academic staff of Leipzig University
Nazi Party members
Nazis who participated in the Beer Hall Putsch
People from Fürth
People from the Kingdom of Bavaria
Physicians in the Nazi Party
Sturmabteilung officers
Academic staff of the University of Giessen